Clannad is an Irish band formed in 1970 in Gweedore, County Donegal by siblings Ciarán, Pól, and Moya Brennan and their twin uncles Noel and Pádraig Duggan. They have adopted various musical styles throughout their history, including folk, folk rock, traditional Irish, Celtic and new-age music, often incorporating elements of smooth jazz and Gregorian chant.

Initially known as Clann as Dobhar, they shortened their name to Clannad in 1973 after winning the Letterkenny Folk Festival with the song "Liza". By 1979, they had released three albums and completed a successful US tour. From 1980 to 1982, they operated as a six-piece with their sister/niece Enya Brennan on additional keyboards and vocals, before she left the group to pursue a solo career. Later in 1982, Clannad gained international attention with their single "Theme from Harry's Game" which became a top-five hit in Ireland and the UK. The song was featured on Magical Ring (1983), which was met with much acclaim. They experimented with more new-age and pop-influenced sounds in the 1980s and 1990s, as evident on Macalla (1985), and Anam (1990). This transition would ultimately go on to define their sound as almost purely 'Celtic', making them innovators of that genre. After Landmarks (1997), the band went on a hiatus in order to pursue solo projects. They regrouped in 2007 as a four piece again, with Moya, Ciarán, Noel, and Pádraig completing a world tour in 2008. In 2013, Pól rejoined and they released Nádúr, their first studio album in fifteen years. Pádraig Duggan died in 2016, leaving the group to embark on their 2020 farewell tour as a quartet.

Clannad have won numerous awards throughout their career, including a Grammy Award, a BAFTA, an Ivor Novello Award, and a Billboard Music Award. They have recorded in six different languages and scored eight UK top 10 albums. They are widely regarded as a band that have brought Irish music and the Irish language to a wider audience, often experiencing more popularity abroad than in their native Ireland.

History

Formation

Clannad was formed in 1970 by siblings Ciarán Brennan, Pól, and Máire Brennan and their twin uncles Noel and Pádraig Duggan. The five grew up in Dore, an area of Gweedore, a remote parish in County Donegal in the northwest corner of Ireland. It is a Gaeltacht region where Irish is the main spoken language. Raised as a Roman Catholic family of musicians, the Brennans' mother, Máire "Baba" Brennan (née Duggan), was a music teacher while their father, Leo Brennan, was a member of the Slieve Foy Band, an Irish showband. Later in their careers the two bought and ran Leo's Tavern, a pub in nearby Meenaleck where the Duggan and Brennan children would perform covers of songs by the Beatles, the Beach Boys, and Joni Mitchell.

The band adopted the name Clann as Dobhar, Irish for 'Family from Dore', when they entered a local music competition, and they used that name until 1973. The Brennans' and Duggans' interest in traditional Irish music reached beyond their native Gweedore, and they performed elsewhere including Tory Island, off Donegal's coast. Armed with some 500 Gaelic songs, they would later begin to arrange these songs for a full band.

1973–1982: Early years and six-piece band with Enya

In 1973, Clannad came in first place in the annual folk festival in Letterkenny, County Donegal which led to a deal with Philips Records. Having now secured a label the group prepared material for their debut album and recorded at Eamonn Andrews Studios in Dublin, choosing Gaelic and English songs and a cover of "Morning Dew" by Bonnie Dobson. Released in 1973, Clannad was met with initial resistance from the label due to the Gaelic songs and the group soon found themselves more popular outside Ireland, particularly Germany. Later in 1973, Clannad competed for Ireland in the heat stages of the 1973 Eurovision Song Contest for Ireland with "An Pháirc" from Clannad as their entry. The band followed their debut with Clannad 2 in 1974, released by Gael Linn Records and produced by Dónal Lunny, founder of Planxty and The Bothy Band. Like their first, Clannad 2 features a mixture of English and Gaelic songs, this time with Lunny and Bothy Band members on additional instruments.

Dúlamán was released in 1976 and named after the Irish folk song "Dúlamán" which became a stage favourite at Clannad concerts. It was recorded at Rockfield Studios in Wales and is their first album produced by Nicky Ryan. At the time of its release, Clannad capitalised on their growing popularity in Europe with their debut tour across the continent. At one show, the standing ovation they received after an extended rendition of "Níl Sé Ina Lá (Níl Sé'n Lá)" from their debut album convinced the group to continue full-time. Recordings from a tour of Switzerland in 1978 were released in the following year as part of their first live album, Clannad in Concert. Also in 1979, Clannad underwent a 36-date tour of North America, the most extensive by an Irish band at the time.

In 1980, Clannad became a six-piece band following the addition of Enya Brennan on keyboards and additional vocals. Ryan wished to expand the group's sound with vocals and electronic instruments and invited her to join. Enya's first recordings with the group were made as a guest musician for their Crann Úll (Irish for Apple Tree), their fifth studio album recorded in Cologne, Germany and released in 1980 on Tara Music. "Ar a Ghabháil 'n a 'Chuain Domh" featured a particularly full band arrangement reflective of their live jams at the time. "Lá Cuimhthíoch Fán dTuath" showed the first hints of the more atmospheric side of the band's arrangements.

By the time Clannad entered Windmill Lane Studios in Dublin to record Fuaim (Irish for Sound), Enya had become a full-time member. The album displays the group's further experimentation with electronic instruments, and Enya is featured on lead vocals on "An tÚll" and "Buaireadh an Phósta". Neil Buckley plays the clarinet and saxophone with Noel Bridgeman on percussion and Pat Farrell on electric guitar. Fuaim was released by Tara Music in 1982. After a further European tour, their managers Nicky Ryan and Roma Ryan left the group. Nicky had brought Enya into the group to expand their sound, yet the group soon settled into their "boring" musical formula once more and called a meeting during the tour. After a group vote, the Ryans split. Enya followed suit, feeling increasingly restricted in a band setting and pursued a solo career with the Ryans as collaborators, causing a rift between the two groups for a short time.

1982–1988: "Theme from Harry's Game", Magical Ring, and commercial success

In 1982, the now five-piece Clannad signed to RCA Records. They then accepted an invitation to record a song for Harry's Game, a three-part television drama depicting The Troubles in Northern Ireland. Ciarán, Pól, and Máire got together and wrote "Theme from Harry's Game". The song became a commercial success upon its release as a single in October 1982, peaking at number 2 in Ireland and number 5 in the UK. It remains the only UK hit single to be sung entirely in Irish. From 1983 to 1987, rock band U2 used the song at the end of every concert. Following their newfound success with "Theme from Harry's Game", Clannad included the song on their seventh studio album, Magical Ring, released in 1983. The single and album marked the start of their international career, and Magical Ring became their first to be certified gold by the British Phonographic Industry (BPI).

After Magical Ring, Clannad were commissioned to score the 26-episode drama series Robin of Sherwood, aired from 1984 to 1986. They once again began to stretch themselves, creating music for a range of characters and events. For the first time in the career, the album was recorded in its entirety in English. The soundtrack was released in 1984 as Legend and won the band a BAFTA award for Best Original Television Music, the first Irish band to win it. In 2003, Clannad revealed that there were other pieces recorded for the third series of Robin of Sherwood that were not included on Legend, yet the master recordings have yet to be found.

In 1985, Clannad released Macalla (Irish for Echo) which was recorded in Switzerland, England, and Ireland. It contained all original material except one traditional song and yielded the group a hit single "In a Lifetime", a duet with U2 singer Bono which begins with Máire being heard teaching Gaelic to Bono during the introduction. The album features numerous backing musicians who have continued to tour with them, including ex-King Crimson saxophonist Mel Collins, Moving Hearts' guitarist Anthony Drennan, and drummer Paul Moran. Also on board was producer Steve Nye, who oversaw the pop-flavoured "Closer to Your Heart" and the ballad "Almost Seems (Too Late to Turn)" and became hit singles, the latter serving as the Children in Need charity single in 1985.

1988–1990: Sirius, Atlantic Realm, and The Angel and the Soldier Boy 
Sirius was released by RCA in 1988 and was recorded in Los Angeles with rock producers Greg Ladanyi and Russ Kunkel, the drummer for James Taylor's band. The album included a duet with Bruce Hornsby and guest appearances by Steve Perry and J.D. Souther. The title track was Pól's encouraging call to the environmental movement, and to the Greenpeace ship of the same name. "Something to Believe In" features Hornsby on vocals and keyboards. Completed with the help of some of the biggest names on the Californian rock scene, Sirius was another different creation, just like their previous three albums.

Between 1988 and 1991, Clannad were involved in side projects including Atlantic Realm (1989) and The Angel and the Soldier Boy (1990). Atlantic Realm was a small album made for a BBC documentary about the Atlantic Ocean. The recording was mainly instrumental as their voices as instruments. The Angel and the Soldier Boy was a half – hour animation without voice overs, with the music telling the story. Both albums proved to be a minor success, and also demonstrated once again that Clannad were one of the most acclaimed soundtrack artists in the music industry. Two greatest hits albums were released at around this time: Past Present and The Collection.

In 1990, Pól initially left the group to pursue a solo career and work with the WOMAD (World of Music, Arts and Dance) organisation in Britain. Pól rejoined the band in January 2011, when Clannad performed at Temple Bar TradFest. Initially a single concert, it was extended with an extra two nights.

1990–2000: Four-piece band, Anam, Banba, and Lore

After Pól's exit, Clannad continued as a quartet and recorded Anam (Irish for Soul) in Dublin and England. It marked a return to their sound heard on Magical Ring and Macalla, and features greater contributions from Ciarán who is credited as a writer on nine of the album's ten original songs. The US edition, released in 1992, features "In a Lifetime" with Bono and "Theme from Harry's Game", which had been included in the film Patriot Games and a Volkswagen television advert, boosting the group's recognition in the country. The public interest generated from the advert made Anam reach No. 46 on the US Billboard 200, still the group's highest position on the chart. The latter won a Billboard Music Award for World Music Song of the Year. Clannad dedicated "Rí na Cruinne", the opening track, was included on the One World One Voice charity album to raise awareness of environmental issues.

In 1991, Clannad released a duet with Paul Young, a cover version of the Joni Mitchell song "Both Sides Now". The track had been put together for the Blake Edwards film Switch, featuring Ellen Barkin. In the storyline, a nasty male chauvinist, is reincarnated as an attractive female. The use of the Joni Mitchell song was therefore suitable and proved a hit for the group. Released in 1993, Banba became Clannad's 13th studio album and received rave reviews and the band's first Grammy nomination. The album jogged comfortably to the number one spot in the World Music Chart. Banba is a romantic mythical name for Ireland. In the track "I Will Find You," written especially for the film The Last of the Mohicans, Máire sings in English, Mohican and Cherokee. Once again all the songs were written and produced by Ciarán Brennan, except "Sunset Dreams", written by Noel Duggan. Moya Brennan described the album as "a fusion of various styles of music, growing out of a traditional Gaelic root." Banba has been described as one of Clannad's most visual albums, and has sold over 1 million copies to date.

The album Lore (1996) gave some thought to the Native American Indians. On "Trail of Tears", when Noel Duggan imagines how it felt to be exiled from one's ancestral land, he was also thinking about these people and their connection with the Irish. It opens with "Croí Cróga" ('braveheart' in English) which was written as a theme tune for the Mel Gibson film Braveheart which, for unknown reasons, never made it onto the soundtrack. Lore features American drummer Vinnie Colaiuta and Mel Collins. It contained a strong jazz element, with songs such as "Seanchas" blending contemporary sounds with traditional Irish music and the Irish language. Clannad toured Europe, Japan, Australia, and New Zealand in 1996 to promote the Lore album, but due to apparent disagreements with Atlantic Records, plans to tour the USA were scrapped. In 1996, they received a lifetime achievement award from the Irish recording industry (the IRMA).

Clannad returned in 1997 with another album, Landmarks.  In the song "Of This Land", Máire sings about Ireland, of its past and of its future. The track "Fadó" (translates as Long Ago), demonstrates the influences of old Celtic history on Clannad's music. It became one of the most celebrated Irish albums in history and in 1999, it won the group a Grammy award for Best New Age Album.

In 1999, the group composed the song "What Will I Do" for the Kevin Costner film, Message in a Bottle.

2000–present: Hiatus and return to activity

After Landmarks, Clannad ceased to make any more studio albums, but had promised to return in the near future. In 2003, they released the best of album, The Best of Clannad: In a Lifetime, which is one of their biggest-selling albums to date.

In 2005 the two Duggan twins, Noel and Pádraig, as the musical duo The Duggans, got together for the first time outside of Clannad and recorded the album Rubicon.

During the 2006 solo tour of Moya Brennan in The Netherlands, the concert in De Doelen, Rotterdam, was dedicated to Leo and Baba Brennan. The whole of Clannad, including former member Pól and sister Deirdre, performed five songs during the second half. The audience, Leo and Baba were unaware of the plan to bring Clannad on-stage, which resulted in multiple standing ovations from the audience.

The five original members of Clannad appeared on stage together at the Celtic Connections Festival in Glasgow on 19 January 2007. The concert was greeted by 2,000 fans who travelled from places such as the US and Brazil to see the legendary group perform some of the most loved songs in their history. While at the Meteor Ireland Music Awards that were held in Dublin on 1 February 2007 Clannad were presented with the coveted Lifetime Achievement Award.

In March 2008, Clannad began their first UK tour in over 12 years, starting at The Sage in Gateshead. The tour culminated in a dozen dates, including concerts in Ireland and Thailand.

In May 2008, Clannad's version of the traditional song "Down by the Salley Gardens" was featured in the listening paper for Music GCSE from the Oxford, Cambridge and RSA Examinations exam board. On 25 August 2008, Clannad released a new compilation album of their early music to contrast the music of their previous compilation album at the beginning of 2008, Beginnings: The Best of the Early Years.

In June 2009, Clannad was nominated for an IMA Award in the category Best Revival Act, along with other revived bands Planxty, Moving Hearts, Arcady and Stockton's Wing.

In January 2011, Clannad's concert at Christ Church Cathedral TempleBar TradFest in Dublin was extended by two nights due to fast ticket sales. The group appeared on RTÉ's The Late Late Show on 21 January 2011 performing the "Theme from Harry's Game" with choral group Anúna. It was their first appearance on the show in 14 years.

On 18 June 2013, Clannad announced that their brand new studio album Nádúr (their first new album since the release of Landmarks in 1998) was to be released worldwide in September 2013. An international tour commenced in October 2013 starting in Australia and New Zealand.

In 2019, Clannad embarked on their In a Lifetime farewell tour, but it was postponed in March 2020 due to the COVID-19 pandemic. A new compilation album entitled, In a Lifetime which included two new tracks, was released.

Noel Duggan died on 15 October 2022.

Musical style and legacy

When Clannad first started out in the early 1970s their music and sound stemmed solely from their traditional background. Despite this they managed to popularise such old songs as "Dúlamán", "Teidhir Abhaile Riú" and "Coinleach Glas An Fhómhair", and these songs have remained popular numbers at their concerts. On the departure from their folk and traditional background in 1982, they created a new sound that would define the meaning of new-age and Celtic music forever. When "Theme from Harry's Game" and "Newgrange" were first heard, radio stations all over the world became fascinated by the earthly and spiritual sound that they had never encountered before. One critic said "the tunes were seeped in the old ways, but the production and the arrangement was fresh and inventive". This transition in Clannad's career is often seen as the birth of Celtic music, and to this day they are regarded as the pioneers of that genre. They are also noted for their melodious harmonies, which have been at the heart of their music since their first album. Legend (1984) was based on English folklore. With later albums, Clannad delved further into the realms of electronica and even pop. Due to this, many of their singles entered pop charts all over the world, and widened their fan base once again. Despite their success with this genre of music, the group managed to maintain a link with their Gaelic roots throughout their career, giving traditional Irish songs such as "Tráthnóna Beag Aréir" and "Buachaill Ón Éirne" the Clannad treatment.

Even though the rock-infused Sirius and the pop-inclined Macalla were successful for Clannad, it was their breakthrough style that they created themselves that has left the greatest legacy. Clannad's influence can be found in the film Titanic, where James Horner admitted to basing the soundtrack on Clannad's style. The soundtrack was so like Clannad's work that it has been incorrectly credited to them for many years. Clannad's 'Celtic mysticism' is a recurring theme in the film Intermission. The "otherworldly" and "ethereal" Clannad sound comes from the ancient hills and glens that surround Gweedore, according to lead singer Moya Brennan. Traces of Clannad's legacy can be heard in the music of many artists, including Enya, Altan, Capercaillie, The Corrs, Loreena McKennitt, Anúna, Riverdance, Órla Fallon and even U2. Bono stated that Moya has "one of the greatest voices the human ear has ever experienced".

A Japanese visual novel released in 2004, which spawned a 2007 film and a 2007–08 television series based on it, was named after the band because screenwriter Jun Maeda mistakenly believed it to mean the word "family" in Irish.

Private lives

Band members

The private life of lead member Moya was detailed in her autobiography in 2000. In it, Brennan recalls her upbringing as the eldest of nine siblings in rural County Donegal, Ireland. Along with the highs of success in the music business, she also recounts low periods where alcohol, drugs and an abortion made her re-evaluate her life. She emerged from dark years as a committed Christian with rekindled faith. She remarried in 1991 (having previously been married to a Dublin musician) and now resides in Dublin with her husband, photographer Tim Jarvis, and children, Aisling and Paul.

The Brennan family
The Brennans are Ireland's most successful music family, with combined sales of over 90 million records. Máire (or Baba) Duggan and Leo Brennan are the parents of the Brennan siblings Máire (or Moya), Leon, Ciarán, Deirdre, Pól, Olive, Eithne (or Enya), Bartley and Brídín. Baba was the local school's music teacher and Leo led the celebrated Slieve Foy show band. The catalyst that would propel the entire family onto the stage was the opening of Leo's Tavern in 1968 in Meenaleck, Co. Donegal.

The other six children can all sing and play one or more instruments—Olive and Deirdre have sung on Moya's solo albums and Brídín, who for years toured with Clannad as a backing vocalist, has released a solo record, Eyes of Innocence. Enya is also Ireland's best selling solo artist, earning international success.

Máire 'Baba' Duggan is currently the lead member of the local Catholic choir, Cór Mhuire Doire Beaga, but no longer continues to teach in the local community school Pobalscoil Ghaoth Dobhair. The choir has been frequently joined by Leo Brennan and the Brennan siblings.

Leo Brennan died on 22 June 2016 (age 90) at his home at Upper Dore, Gweedore in West Donegal, Ireland.

Leon Brennan, one of the nine siblings of the Brennan family died in December 2021. Online announcements were made by his sisters Moya, and Enya, in a rare personal message on 17 December 2021.

Members
Current members
 Ciarán Brennan – bass, guitar, keyboards, mandolin, vocals (1970–present)
 Moya Brennan – vocals, harp (1970–present)
 Pól Brennan – flute, guitar, percussion, whistles, vocals (1970–1990, 2011–present)

Former members
 Noel Duggan – guitar, vocals (1970–2022; his death)
 Pádraig Duggan – guitar, mandola, mandolin, vocals (1970–2016; his death)
 Enya Brennan – percussion, keyboards, vocals (1980–1982)

Discography

Studio albums
  Clannad (1973)
  Clannad 2 (1974)
 Dúlamán (1976)
 Crann Úll (1980)
 Fuaim (1982)
 Magical Ring (1983)
 Legend (1984)
 Macalla (1985)
 Sirius (1987)
 Atlantic Realm (1989)
  The Angel and the Soldier Boy (1989)
 Anam (1990)
  Banba (1994)
 Lore (1996)
 Landmarks (1997)
 Nádúr (2013)

EPs
  Christmas Angels (1997)

Live albums
 Clannad in Concert (1979) 
 Clannad: Live in Concert (2005)
 Clannad: Christ Church Cathedral (2012)
 Turas 1980 (2018)

Videography
 Pastpresent (1989)
 Clannad: Christ Church Cathedral (2012)

Bibliography
  Pastpresent (1989)
Sheet music book for 'Past Present'
 A Woman's Voice (1991)
Eddie Rowley in conversation with Máire Brennan
 Ireland: Landscapes of God's Peace, Máire Brennan (2002)
sometimes called God of Peace
  The Other Side of the Rainbow, Máire Brennan with Angela Little (2001)
Later subtitled: The Autobiography of the Voice of Clannad
Moments in a Lifetime, Noel Duggan (2008)
Detailing Clannad's journey as a band

Awards and nominations

Won
1982: 1982 Ivor Novello Awards, Best Soundtrack for "Theme From Harry's Game"
1984: 1984 BAFTA Awards, Best Television Music for "Robin of Sherwood"
1992: Billboard Music Award, World Music Song of the Year for "Rí na Cruinne"
1999: Grammy Awards of 1999, Best New Age Album for "Landmarks"
2007: Meteor Music Awards, Lifetime Achievement Award
2014: BBC Radio 2 Folk Awards, Lifetime Achievement Award

Nominations
1982: 1982 BAFTA Awards, Best Television Music for "Harry's Game"
1994: Grammy Awards of 1994, Best New Age Album for "Banba"
1996: Grammy Awards of 1996, Best New Age Album for "Lore"
2009: Ireland's Music Awards, Best Revival Act

References

External links
 Official Clannad website
 
 

 
BAFTA winners (people)
Celtic fusion groups
Celtic rock groups
Culture in Gweedore
Family musical groups
Grammy Award winners
Irish folk musical groups
Irish folk rock groups
Ivor Novello Award winners
Musical groups established in 1970
Musical groups from County Donegal
RCA Records artists